UFC Fight Night: Santos vs. Walker (also known as UFC Fight Night 193, UFC Vegas 38 and UFC on ESPN+ 51) was a mixed martial arts event produced by the Ultimate Fighting Championship that took place on October 2, 2021 at the UFC Apex facility in Enterprise, Nevada, part of the Las Vegas Metropolitan Area, United States.

Background
A light heavyweight bout between former UFC Light Heavyweight Championship title challenger Thiago Santos and Johnny Walker headlined the event.

A women's bantamweight bout between Aspen Ladd and The Ultimate Fighter: Heavy Hitters featherweight winner Macy Chiasson was expected to take place at the event. The pairing was initially scheduled for UFC on ESPN: Sandhagen vs. Dillashaw, but it was removed from that card on July 19 after Chiasson suffered a stress fracture in her foot. At the weigh-ins, Ladd weighed in at 137 pounds, one pound over the bantamweight non-title limit, leading to the fight cancellation.

A light heavyweight bout between Jimmy Crute and Jamahal Hill was initially targeted for the event. However, the bout was rescheduled in early September for UFC Fight Night: Font vs. Aldo two months later.

A lightweight bout between Carlos Diego Ferreira and Grant Dawson was scheduled for the event. However, Ferreira pulled out of the fight in early September citing an injury. Dawson was then rescheduled to face Ricky Glenn at UFC Fight Night: Costa vs. Vettori.

The Ultimate Fighter: Brazil 2 welterweight winner Leonardo Santos and Alexander Hernandez were expected to meet in a lightweight bout at the event. However, Santos pulled out of the event due to undisclosed reasons. He was replaced by Mike Breeden.

At the weigh-ins, two other fighters missed weight for their respective bouts. Mike Breeden weighed in at 158.5 pounds, two and a half pounds over the lightweight non-title fight limit. Former UFC Women's Bantamweight Championship challenger Bethe Correia weighed in at 138.5 pounds, two and a half pounds over the women's bantamweight non-title fight limit. Both bouts proceeded at a catchweight with Breeden and Correia each fined 20% of their purses, which went to their opponents Alexander Hernandez and Karol Rosa respectively.

Results

Bonus awards
The following fighters received $50,000 bonuses.
 Fight of the Night: No bonus awarded.
 Performance of the Night: Casey O'Neill, Jamie Mullarkey, Douglas Silva de Andrade and Alejandro Pérez

See also 

 List of UFC events
 List of current UFC fighters
 2021 in UFC

References 

UFC Fight Night
2021 in mixed martial arts
October 2021 sports events in the United States
2021 in sports in Nevada
Mixed martial arts in Las Vegas
Sports competitions in Las Vegas